James Stillingfleet may refer to:
 James Stillingfleet (priest, born 1674) (1674–1746), Dean of Worcester
 James Stillingfleet (priest, born 1741) (1741–1826), English evangelical cleric